Forlagið (meaning "The Publishing House") is the largest publishing house in Iceland. It publishes around 150 titles a year under five different imprints: JPV, Mál og menning, and Ókeibækur. It is also publishes maps.

In 2008 it merged with Vegamót. Mál og menning is a controlling shareholder of Forlagið. At the time of its creation, it was ten times larger than the second largest Icelandic publishing house. In 2017, it had a 50% share of the general publishing market in Iceland, and was four times larger than the second largest, Bjartur-Veröld.

Annual net profits are around 50 million ISK ( USD in 2016).

In 2020, the Swedish audiobook service Storytel bought 70% of the company.

References

External links 

  (in Icelandic)

Literary publishing companies
Publishing companies of Iceland
Icelandic literature